Mohsen Adeli (born 20 March 1972) is an Iranian chemist and Distinguished Professor of Chemistry at Lorestan University and guest professor at the Free University of Berlin.
He is known for his research works in the field of macromolecular chemistry, nanomaterials and materials chemistry.

Career
After high school in Khorramabad, where he graduated in 1992, he studied Pure Chemistry at Lorestan University 1993-1997. He received his MSc in Organic Chemistry in 2001 under supervision of Aliakbar Entezami, and subsequently his PhD in the same field under supervision of Hasan Namazi in 2005 at Tabriz University. Adeli graduated with his thesis entitled Synthesis of citric acid dendrimers and their application as drug delivery agents. He received a research fellowship in the Department of Chemistry at Dortmund University under Rainer Haag in 2005. Then in 2007 he joined Sharif University of Technology Institute of Science and Nanotechnology as a postdoctoral researcher. Since 2014, he has been a visiting professor at the Free University of Berlin.

Adeli’s multidisciplinary research focuses on organic chemistry, polymer science and nanomedicine and addresses several innovative subjects such synthesis of new polymeric architectures and investigation of their physicochemical properties as well as their applications in the field of nanomedicine. Deep understanding of the mechanism of in plane polymerizations and their properties at biointerfaces has resulted in development of new antimicrobial, antiviral, anticancer and wound healing therapeutics. He is developing new methods for the construction of organic frameworks.

References 

Living people
Iranian chemists
Academic staff of Lorestan University
1972 births
Academic staff of the Free University of Berlin
Iranian nanotechnologists
University of Tabriz alumni
Lorestan University alumni
Iranian physical chemists
People from Khorramabad
Distinguished professors in Iran